Carruanthus ringens (syn. Carruanthus caninus) is from the Carruanthus genus of flowering plants from the ice plant family Aizoaceae. It has gained the Royal Horticultural Society's Award of Garden Merit.

Carruanthus ringens, like Carruanthus peersi, is a species native to South Africa.

Carruanthus ringens grows to a height of 20 cm. This succulent is drought tolerant and grows best in soils of pH 6 and 8. If kept completely dry it will withstand mild frost. The plant bears flowers that are similar in shape and colour to dandelions with fewer petals.

References

ringens